The Warsaw University of Technology is one of the leading institutes of technology in Poland and one of the largest in Central Europe. It employs 2,453 teaching faculty, with 357 professors (including 145 titular professors). The student body numbers 36,156 (as of 2011), mostly full-time. There are 19 faculties (divisions) covering almost all fields of science and technology. They are in Warsaw, except for one in Płock.

The Warsaw University of Technology has about 5,000 graduates per year. According to the 2008 Rzeczpospolita newspaper survey, engineers govern Polish companies. Warsaw Tech alums make up the highest percentage of Polish managers and executives. Every ninth president among the top 500 corporations in Poland is a graduate of the Warsaw University of Technology. Professor Kurnik, the rector, explained that the school provides a solid basis for the performance of managers by equipping its students with an education at the highest level and a preparation with the tools and information, including knowledge of foreign languages.

The origins of Warsaw University of Technology date back to 1826 when engineering education was begun in the Warsaw Institute of Technology.

In 2018, Times Higher Education ranked the university within the global 601-800 band.

History

1826–1831 
The origins of Polish universities of technology go back to the 18th century. They were related to either military technology or mining, which demanded complicated technological processes as a result of the exploitation of deeper seams. The model school of technology, a university of technology, was designed by the French, who in 1794 founded the Ecole polytechnique, in Paris. At the beginning of the 19th century universities of technology were opened in Prague (in 1806), Vienna (1815), and Karlsruhe (1824).

In Poland, the first multidisciplinary university of technology was the Preparatory School for the Institute of Technology, which opened on 4 January 1826. The Warsaw University of Technology still cultivates its traditions. The man who played the most important part in creating the school and writing its charter was Stanisław Staszic. Kajetan Garbiński, a mathematician and Warsaw University professor became the director. The school was closed in 1831, after the November Insurrection.

1898–1914 

In 1898, the Technological Section of the Warsaw Society for Russian Commerce and Industry, whose director was engineer Kazimierz Obrębowicz, collected funds for the opening of Emperor Nicolas II University of Technology. Classes, with Russian as the language of instruction, started on 5 September in the building at 81 Marszałkowska Street. They were soon moved to new buildings, built especially for the institute. They were designed by Bronisław Rogóyski and Stefan Szyller.

On the day of its opening, the university had three faculties: Mathematics, Chemistry, as well as Engineering and Construction. In June 1902, the Faculty of Mining was opened. Poles constituted the majority of students until 1905 when their number reached 1,100.

1915–1939 

After German troops entered Warsaw on 5 August 1915, they wanted to gain the sympathy of Poles and allowed University of Warsaw and the Warsaw University of Technology to open with Polish as the language of instruction. The grand opening of both universities was held on 15 November 1915. Zygmunt Straszewicz was the first rector of the Warsaw University of Technology. World War I, together with the events connected with the restitution of the Polish State and the Polish-Bolshevik war did not help the development of the school. Daily lectures only started in November 1920. The school taught the young future engineers at the faculties of Mechanics, Electrical Engineering, Chemistry, Architecture, Civil Engineering, Aquatic Engineering, and Geodesy (or, since 1925, Measuring). The last three faculties were merged on the basis of the new Academic Schools Law of 13 March 1933. The Polish Cabinet issued a decree on 25 September 1933, in which the new Faculty of Engineering was created.

The number of the Warsaw University of Technology students in the 20 years between the wars grew from 2,540 in the 1918/1819 academic year to 4,673 just before the outbreak of World War II. In the same period, the school granted more than 6,200 diplomas, including 320 for women. The Warsaw University of Technology became the most important scientific centre of engineering in Poland and gained international prestige. At that time, 66 graduates earned Doctor of Philosophy degrees, and 50 qualified as assistant professors. The university was a centre of scientific research for people whose achievements were fundamental for world science and technology, including Karol Adamiecki, Stefan Bryła, Jan Czochralski, Tytus Maksymilian Huber, Janusz Groszkowski, Mieczysław Wolfke and many others.

1939–1945 
During World War II, despite enormous material losses and repressive measures, the Warsaw University of Technology continued to operate underground. Teaching continued in clandestine and open courses, in vocational schools, and from 1942, in a two-year State Higher Technical School. Approximately 3,000 students took part in the clandestine courses and 198 earned engineer diplomas. Scientific research was conducted, as 20 PhD and 14 assistant-professorship qualifying theses were written. Considerable work served the reconstruction of Poland after the war and constitute the foundation for the development of science. Students and professors secretly worked on projects. Professors Janusz Groszkowski, Marceli Struszyński, and Józef Zawadzki conducted a detailed analysis of the radio and steering devices of the German V-2 rockets, at the request of Polish Home Army Intelligence.

1945–present 

After German troops were dislodged from Warsaw, classes started in improvised conditions on 22 January 1945. By the end of the year, all the pre-war faculties were re-opened. Old and war-damaged buildings were rebuilt quickly; new ones were erected. In 1951 the Warsaw University of Technology incorporated the Wawelberg and Rotwand's School of Engineering.

The Academic and Research Centre in Płock was created in 1967.

In 1945 there were 2,148 students in six faculties (divisions). By 1999 there were 22,000 students enrolled in 16 faculties. The Warsaw University of Technology granted over 104,000 Bachelor of Science and Master of Science engineer degrees between the years 1945 and 1998.

Over the years, the university was an important scientific centre, educating academic staff for its own purposes and for other Polish schools of technology. Between 1945 and 1998, 5,500 PhD theses were written. There were almost 1,100 theses qualifying for assistant professorships. The number of academic staff grew significantly. In 1938, the university had 98 tenured professors and associate professors, as well as 307 assistant professors and teaching assistants; in 1948 there were 87 and 471; while in 1999 there were 371 professors, 1,028 tutors, 512 lecturers, and 341 teaching assistants.

Faculties 

 Faculty of Administration and Social Science
 Faculty of Architecture
 Faculty of Automotive and Construction Machinery Engineering
 Faculty of Chemical and Process Engineering
 Faculty of Chemistry
 Faculty of Civil Engineering
 Faculty of Electrical Engineering
 Faculty of Electronics and Information Technology
 Faculty of Building Services, Hydro and Environmental Engineering
 Faculty of Geodesy and Cartography
 Faculty of Mathematics and Information Science
 Faculty of Management
 Faculty of Materials Science and Engineering
 Faculty of Mechatronics
 Faculty of Production Engineering
 Faculty of Physics
 Faculty of Power and Aeronautical Engineering
 Faculty of Transport
 WUT Business School

Płock Campus:
 Faculty of Civil Engineering, Mechanics and Petrochemistry
 College of Economics and Social Sciences

Transport 
The transport faculty is engaged in research into the development of railway variable gauge axles which help overcome breaks of gauge, such as the SUW 2000 system and INTERGAUGE.

Notable alumni 
Tomasz Bagiński (born 1976) – illustrator, animator and director
Ryszard Bartel (1897–1982) – engineer
Mieczysław G. Bekker (1905–1989) – engineer and scientist
Antoni Bohdziewicz (1906–1970) – screenplay writer and director
Joanna Chmielewska (1932–2013) – novelist and screenwriter
Patricia Kazadi (born 1988) – actress, singer, dancer, and television personality
Antoni Kocjan (1902–1944) – glider constructor and Home Army soldier during World War II 
Vadim Komkov (1919–2008) – mathematician
Alfred Korzybski (1879–1950) – engineer, mathematician and philosopher
Bohdan Kulakowski (1942–2006) – mechanical engineer, professor at Pennsylvania State University
Stefan Kurylowicz (1972–2011) – architect and professor of architecture
Jan Lenica (1928–2001) – graphic designer and cartoonist
Henryk Magnuski (1909–1978) – telecommunications engineer
Myron Mathisson (1897–1940) – theoretical physicist
Zbigniew Michalewicz – computer scientist, entrepreneur
Witold Nazarewicz (born 1954) – nuclear physicist
Henryk Orfinger (born 1951) – entrepreneur
Waldemar Pawlak (born 1959) – politician, former Prime Minister of Poland
Przemysław Prusinkiewicz – computer scientist
Andrzej Piotr Ruszczyński (born 1951) – applied mathematician
Maciej Matthew Szymanski (1926–2015) – architect in Canada
Andrew Targowski (born 1937) – Polish-American computer scientist
Andrzej Tomaszewski (1934–2010) – historian of art and culture
Andrzej Trautman (born 1933) – mathematical physicist
Władysław Turowicz (1908–1980) – Polish-Pakistani aviator, military scientist and aeronautical engineer
Michał Vituška (1907–1945) – Belarusian leader of the Black Cats
Marian Walentynowicz (1896–1967) – architect, graphic designer and comic book pioneer
Stanisław Wigura (1903–1933) – aircraft designer and aviator
Tomasz Wiktorowski (born 1981) – tennis coach
Zbigniew Zapasiewicz (1934–2009) – actor, theatre director and pedagogue
Józef Zawadzki (1886–1951) – physical chemist

See also 
 List of universities in Poland

References

External links

 Official Page
 Student Internet Television TVPW
 Students' Union of Warsaw University of Technology
 Erasmus Student Network of Warsaw University of Technology

 
Educational institutions established in 1826
Science and technology in Poland
1826 establishments in the Russian Empire
1826 establishments in Poland